It's Never Too Late to Mend (alternatively just Never Too Late to Mend; US release title Never Too Late) is a 1937 British melodrama film directed by David MacDonald and starring Tod Slaughter, Jack Livesey and Marjorie Taylor. In the film, a villainous squire and Justice of the Peace conspires to have his rival in love arrested on false charges.

It is based on the 1856 novel It Is Never Too Late to Mend by Charles Reade. The film was made at Shepperton Studios as a quota quickie for release by Metro-Goldwyn-Mayer. It was popular enough to be re-released in 1942.

The novel was adapted once before, as a British silent film in 1922, starring Russell Thorndike as Squire Meadows.

Plot summary

Cast
 Tod Slaughter as Squire John Meadows 
 Jack Livesey as Tom Robinson 
 Marjorie Taylor as Susan Merton 
 Ian Colin as George Fielding 
 Laurence Hanray as Lawyer Crawley
 D.J. Williams as Farmer Merton 
 Roy Russell as Reverend Mr. Eden 
 John Singer as Matthew Josephs
 Leonard Sharp as Bradshaw
 Mavis Villiers as Betty 
 Cecil Bevan as Prison Inspector 
 Douglas Stewart as Prison Inspector 
 Jack Vyvian as Innkeeper

Critical reception
TV Guide wrote, "Great fun in the old cloak-and-dagger melodrama style...Played in an exaggerated, bigger-than-life manner, this melodrama is a good enough outing, particularly for fans of camp." and Sky Movies wrote, "As usual, Tod Slaughter ignores the intimacy of the film medium and roars through this movie at full throttle, giving the kind of marvellously storming performance that would easily have reached the back row of the upper circle...David MacDonald is more a referee than a conventional director, coming up with a highly entertaining slice of ripe and fruity hokum."

References

External links
 
 

1937 films
British historical drama films
1930s historical drama films
Films directed by David MacDonald (director)
Films based on British novels
British black-and-white films
Films set in England
Films set in the 19th century
Quota quickies
Films scored by Jack Beaver
Melodrama films
1930s English-language films
1930s British films